Zacharo beach, is the name of a beach that is located in the vicinity of Zacharo, in Southwestern Greece. It is situated on the Ionian Sea coast, in the area of the Gulf of Kyparissia. The beach features a soft, sandy terrain and is one of the lengthiest in Greece. It has been awarded the Blue flag prize for water quality and environmental management.

Gallery

References

Beaches of Greece
Landforms of Elis
Tourist attractions in Western Greece
Landforms of Western Greece